Fredvang is a village in Flakstad Municipality in Nordland county, Norway.  The village is located on the island of Moskenesøya in the Lofoten archipelago.  The village is fairly isolated with the Fredvang Bridges being the only road connection to the village from the rest of Norway.

References

Flakstad
Villages in Nordland
Populated places of Arctic Norway